The Texas Association was a sports league of minor league baseball teams in Texas that operated from 1923 through 1926. An earlier league, initially known as the Texas-Southern League, used the same name from mid-1896 through 1899. History of the Texas Association during the 1920s follows.

History 

The league operated in 1923 with a six-team format. The Austin Rangers, Corsicana Oilers, Marlin Bathers, Mexia Gushers, Sherman Twins, and Waco Indians made up the league that year. While Mexia had the best win–loss record for the entire season, the league played a split season, with Sherman winning the first half, and Austin winning the second half. Sherman and Austin played a six-game playoff series, which ended in a tie at three games each.

The Sherman squad did not return for 1924 and was replaced by the Temple Surgeons; all other teams returned. Corsicana finished in first place during both halves of the split season, thus no playoffs were held.

For 1925, the Austin Rangers became the Austin Senators, while the Waco club did not return and was replaced by the Terrell Terrors; all other teams returned. On May 13, Marlin moved to Palestine to become the Palestine Pals. Corsicana again won both halves of a split season. Minor league legend Smead Jolley played for Corsicana that year, while 12-year major league veteran Boom-Boom Beck suited up for the Marlin/Palestine club.

1926 was the final year of the Texas Association, with all six teams returning from the previous year. Austin won the first half of the split season and Palestine won the second half. These two teams played a postseason series, won by Palestine, three games to none.

No effort was made to bring the league back for 1927. Teams of three cities moved to the newly formed Lone Star League (Palestine, Mexia and Corsicana) while three others ceased operations (Austin, Terrell, and Temple). Teams based in Austin and Temple later played in the Big State League of the late 1940s and early 1950s, while Terrell has yet to field another team.

Cities Represented 1923-1926 
Austin, TX: Austin Rangers 1923–1924; Austin Senators 1925–1926 
Corsicana, TX: Corsicana Oilers 1923–1926 
Marlin, TX: Marlin Bathers 1923–1925 
Mexia, TX: Mexia Gushers 1923–1926 
Palestine, TX: Palestine Pals 1925–1926 
Sherman, TX & Denison, TX: Sherman-Denison Twins 1923 
Temple, TX: Temple Surgeons 1924–1926 
Terrell, TX: Terrell Terrors 1925–1926 
Waco, TX: Waco Indians 1923–1924

Teams & Statistics

1923 Texas Association
schedule
 Playoff: Austin 3 games, Sherman 3. The series was declared a tie when the two clubs could not agree upon a site for the deciding game. 
Player statistics

1924 Texas Association
schedule
 Playoff: None 
Player statistics

1925 Texas Association
schedule 1st halfschedule 2nd half
Marlin moved to Palestine May 13.
Player statistics

1926 Texas Association
 Playoff: Palestine 3 games, Austin 0. 
Player statistics

References

Defunct minor baseball leagues in the United States
Baseball leagues in Texas
Sports leagues established in 1923
1923 establishments in Texas
1926 disestablishments in Texas